The Battle of Talahandak took place on 3 June 2020 during the Mali War. It resulted in the death of Abdelmalek Droukdel, the leader of al-Qaeda in the Islamic Maghreb (AQIM).

Background 
On 1 June 2020, with aid from US intelligence, French special forces closely working with Operation Barkhane identified that Abdelmalek Droukdel, the leader of AQIM, was present in the environs around Tessalit, Mali. After the scanning operation, French general staff declared that after two days of electromagnetic signal scanning, they identified that a target of interest was in the region.

Battle 
On 3 June, the operation was launched by operators of the French Special Operations Command to eliminate Abdelmalek Droukdel.

The AQIM group was composed of Abdelmalek Droukdel, the leader of AQIM, Toufik Chaib, a senior leader of AQIM in charge of propaganda and coordination with Jama'at Nasr al-Islam wal Muslimin (JNIM). They were accompanied by three AQIM jihadists. Based on accounts from the Agence France-Presse, the area was described as a crossroads for truckers, who sometimes wait for several weeks the border with Algeria to be opened, as well as a "hotspot for migrant trafficking", according to a UN expert in Mali.

The operation was launched by 15 French special operators with two Caracal helicopters, one Tiger attack helicopter, a Gazelle helicopter and an MQ-9 Reaper drone. Because of the weather conditions in the area, French special forces had to operate on the ground during daylight.

During the beginning of the clashes, the AQIM command attempted to flee from the encounter. However, they were forced to attempt a counterattack against the French special forces, leading to a subsequent close quarter firefight. Four AQIM jihadists were killed, including Droukdel and Chaib, while the driver of the white SUV surrendered, and was taken captive by the French army.

Aftermath 
On 5 June 2020, the Minister of the Armed Forces, Florence Parly, announced through her Twitter account the death of Abdelmalek Droukdel, and declared that the "essential fight for peace and stability in the region has just been a major success". The United States Africa Command (AFRICOM) indicated that it had confirmation of the death of Droukdel through their own means. According to France 24's journalist Wassim Nasr, Droukdel's death is also confirmed by sources close to AQIM. AQIM officially acknowledged the death of its leader in a video published almost two weeks later.

The French army declared that they do not know how long Abdelmalek Droukdel had been in Mali, but journalist Wassim Nasr said that according to AQIM sources, Droukdel was on his way to a meeting with Iyad Ag Ghaly, the head of JNIM. Le Monde indicates that according to an official French source, it had not been long since Abdelmalek was in Mali, without knowing if it was because of movement constrained by the events in Algeria or if it was deliberately in line with AQIM's development, they had information for a month that the AQIM staff was heading towards the north of Mali. This led Droukdel to expose himself to intelligence agencies.

References

External links

2020 in international relations
2020 in Mali
Al-Qaeda in the Islamic Maghreb
Talahandak
Talahandak
Coordinates not on Wikidata
Islamic terrorist incidents in 2020
June 2020 events in Africa
Kidal Region
Operations involving French special forces
Terrorist incidents in Africa in 2020